Saint-Alphonse-Rodriguez is a municipality in the Lanaudière region of Quebec, Canada, part of the Matawinie Regional County Municipality.

Demographics

Population

Private dwellings occupied by usual residents: 1529 (total dwellings: 2363)

Language
Mother tongue:
 English as first language: 1.9%
 French as first language: 95.7%
 English and French as first language: 1.1%
 Other as first language: 1.3%

Education

Commission scolaire des Samares operates Francophone public schools:
 École de Saint-Alphonse

Sir Wilfrid Laurier School Board operates Anglophone public schools:
 Rawdon Elementary School in Rawdon
 Joliette High School in Joliette

See also
List of municipalities in Quebec

References

Incorporated places in Lanaudière
Municipalities in Quebec
Matawinie Regional County Municipality